The Ambedkar family is the family of B. R. Ambedkar (14 April 1891 – 6 December 1956) who was an Indian polymath and the chairman  of the  Constituent Drafting Committee. The patriarch Ambedkar is popularly known as Babasaheb (Marathi: endearment for "father", in India).

Family tree

Photos

See also
 B. R. Ambedkar
 Political families of Maharashtra
 List of things named after B. R. Ambedkar

References

Indian families
Buddhist families
 
Political families of India